North West College is a regional college with two primary campuses in Meadow Lake and North Battleford providing adult educational training in the northwest region of Saskatchewan. Covering a region of 44,000 km2, North West College is committed to rural and First Nations education. In 2017-18 North West offered programming in 21 communities including 12 First Nations.

Programs
North West College provides adult education options including EAL, Adult Basic Education, GED training and testing, Industry Skills Credit and Institution Credit Programs, Safety Tickets, University undergraduate courses and a Bachelor & Master's degree in Education through the University of Regina. North West College brokers courses with Saskatchewan Polytechnic, the University of Saskatchewan and the University of Regina.

See also
Higher education in Saskatchewan
List of colleges in Canada#Saskatchewan

References

External links

Colleges in Saskatchewan
Vocational education in Canada
Meadow Lake, Saskatchewan
North Battleford
Educational institutions established in 1975
1975 establishments in Saskatchewan